The Brisbane Bullets are an Australian professional men's basketball team in the National Basketball League (NBL) based in Brisbane, Queensland. They competed from 1979 to 2008, and returned to the league in 2016. Brisbane were one of ten NBL foundation teams and have won three NBL championships, being successful in the 1985 and 1987 seasons, and again in 2007. They also competed in the 1984, 1986 and 1990 grand finals. The team reached the playoffs 21 times in their illustrious 30-year history.

On 30 June 2008, it was announced that the Bullets license had been returned to the NBL, following financial difficulties for owner Eddy Groves and the failure of attempts to find a new ownership group.

For the 2014–15 season, the NBL hoped for the return of a Brisbane-based franchise, bringing up the possibility of a Bullets resurrection. These hopes finally came to fruition on 17 September 2015, with the Bullets being revived for a return to the NBL in 2016–17.

History

Early years
The Bullets were established in 1979 by Brisbane Amateur Basketball Association for the foundation season of the National Basketball League, under the captaincy of Bruce Fitzgerald, and head coach Bob Young. Of the 18 games played during the inaugural NBL season, Brisbane won 13 and lost five, finishing in fifth place. Brisbane's Cal Bruton finished as the league's highest points per game scorer of the season.

The Bullets made it to the finals in the second NBL season of 1980. Dave Claxton took over as head coach as well. Finishing in third place, winning 17 of their 22-season games, the Bullets met the West Adelaide Bearcats in the second semi-final, losing 101–94. Brian Banks made the All-NBL first team that season. Banks became the Bullets' captain the following season. After making the finals in the second season, Brisbane did so again in 1981. Brisbane finished in fifth place, but first-placed St. Kilda did not attend the finals, as they were in Brazil contesting the World Club Championship. The Bullets lost to Launceston Casino City 71–69 in the first semi-final. In 1982, with new coach Rick Harden, the Bullets missed out on qualifying for the finals, finishing eighth. In the following season, they finished fifth, still outside of finals contention. Import guard Ron "The Rat" Radliff, known for his long curly hair and brilliant outside shooting, played his first season for the Bullets and in the NBL in 1983.

Championship Years
Under new coach Brian Kerle, who would go on to win the 1984 Coach of the Year award, the Bullets' first playoffs appearance since 1981 came about after finishing the 1984 regular season in first place with a 19–5 record, a major improvement on their 10–12 record in 1983. After defeating the Coburg Giants and the Geelong Supercats in the finals, the team were into their first ever NBL Grand Final with the game to be played at The Glass House in Melbourne (1984 would be the last year that the NBL Grand Final was played at a pre-determined 'neutral' venue). Unfortunately, they were not successful in capturing their first championship, losing to the defending champion Canberra Cannons 84–82 who were led by the Australian Boomers point guard Phil Smyth. Star import Leroy Loggins, who had returned to the Bullets in 1984 after two seasons with the West Adelaide Bearcats, capped off a great season with the Bullets by winning his first of 3 NBL Most Valuable Player Awards as well as being named at Small forward in the All-NBL Team.

The Bullets had emerged as the league's most powerful team under Brian Kerle and again finished in first place the 1985 season with a 20–6 record, and were again Grand Finalists after a hard fought win over the Cannons in the finals. With the game being held at their home venue, the Chandler Arena, the Bullets were still favourites to defeat the Adelaide 36ers (whose merger with the Bearcats in 1985 had seen them become an NBL force for the first time) in what was to be the last single game grand final in NBL history despite the 36ers defeating the Newcastle Falcons by the record score of 151–103 in their Semi-final. Leading 78–74 going into the last period of play, the Bullets then outscored Adelaide 42–21, setting an NBL grand final record for points scored in the final period and easily accounting for the 36ers 120–95 to record their first ever championship win.

The team's major change during the 1986 season was when they moved out of the 2,700 seat Chandler Arena and into the brand new Brisbane Entertainment Centre which could seat up to 13,500 fans, easily giving the Bullets the largest and newest home arena in the NBL at the time (the next largest venue in the league was The Glass House which could only seat 7,200). Indeed, the Entertainment Centre was not only the NBL's but also Australia's then largest indoor arena. They finished the regular season in third place with a 17–8 record but progressed to their third Grand Final in a row with wins over the Sydney Supersonics and regular finals opponent Canberra in the playoffs. In the first ever NBL grand final series to be played over three games, the Bullets lost to the Ken Cole coached Adelaide 36ers 2–1, losing Game 3 of the series 113–91 in Adelaide (the 36ers had a league leading 24–2 record for the season including a 13–0 record at home). In the opening game, over 11,000 fans, a then indoor sports attendance record in Australia, saw the 36ers defeat the Bullets 122–119 in overtime at the Entertainment Centre, while they became the only team to defeat the 36ers in Adelaide in 1986 when they won Game 2 104–83 at the Apollo Stadium. Leroy Loggins was again voted the league's MVP in 1986, giving himself and Brisbane a second MVP title while he was again a unanimous selection to the All-NBL Team. Crucially though, Loggins fouled out of both Game 1 and 3 of the Grand Final series which limited his on court impact.

1987 saw the Bullets back to second on the ladder (again behind only Adelaide) with a 20–6 season, earning themselves a bye in the playoffs until the Semi-finals. There they defeated the Illawarra Hawks two games to one to advance to a league record fourth grand final in a row, where this time they were up against the Perth Wildcats in their first ever Grand Final series after upsetting the 36ers 2–1 in their Semi-final series. Perth were player/coached by former Bullets favourite Cal Bruton, who had left the club at the end of 1986 after a public falling out with Brian Kerle. Bruton had successfully turned the Wildcats into a championship contender with the addition of forwards Kendall "Tiny" Pinder and the "Alabama Slamma" James Crawford. The Bullets won their second NBL championship, winning the first game 80–79 in a thriller in Perth, before taking out Game 2 106–87 at the Entertainment Centre in Brisbane. Leroy Loggins continued to star for the Bullets, and in 1987, he won his third MVP award (shared with Adelaide's 1986 Grand Final MVP Mark Davis), as well as being voted as the Grand Final MVP for the series win over the Wildcats (although the Grand Final MVP was his first official award, Loggins had also been the player of the game with 41 points in the 1985 Grand Final victory).

Form slump
The Bullets finished the 1988 regular season in third place with an 18–6 record, but they couldn't manage to reach their fifth grand final in a row after losing in the elimination final. A highlight of the 1988 season for the Bullets was first year player Shane Heal winning the NBL's Rookie of the Year award. The 1989 season saw the team fail to make the playoffs for the first time since 1983 when they finished the regular season in eighth place with an 11–13 record. In the wake of this disappointing season, the Bullets' line-up was extensively overhauled: Leroy Loggins, Greg Fox, and Robert Sibley were the only players from the 1989 Bullets team to continue with the club for the 1990 season, while both Larry Sengstock and Ron Radliff left to join the NBL's second Queensland-based team, the Gold Coast Cougars, for its inaugural season in 1990.

Boosted by new imports Derek Rucker and Andre Moore, the Bullets made a huge turn around in 1990, finishing in third place and going 18–8 for the season. They would again win their way into the grand final, again playing the Perth Wildcats. This time however the Bullets lost 2–1, losing Game 3 at home 109–86. Game 2 of the series, with the Bullets levelling at one game all with a 106–90 win, saw a then NBL grand final record crowd of 13,221 at the Brisbane Entertainment Centre. This would stand the highest ever grand final crowd for a game played outside of Melbourne until 13,527 saw Game 2 of the 2012–13 Grand Final series between the Wildcats and New Zealand Breakers at Perth Arena. The attendance remains the eighth largest for an NBL Grand Final game. Brian Kerle won his second Coach of the Year award, while new import guard Derek Rucker becoming the second Bullets player to win the NBL's MVP award.

The 1991 season was not nearly as successful, as the team finished in ninth place, way out of finals contention with a 13–13 record. However, in 1992, the Bullets were back in the finals, making it to the quarter-finals. In 1993, former NBL Coach of the Year (1988) and championship winning coach of the North Melbourne Giants (1989) Bruce Palmer became the new Bullets coach, and the team made it as far as the semi-finals.

From 1994 through to the 1996 seasons, the Bullets made it as far as the quarter-finals, finishing in fifth, sixth and eighth place respectively. David Ingham took over as head coach for the 1996 and 1997 seasons, with Brian Kerle returning to the club to coach the Bullets from 1998 to 2000. During this time, the high cost of playing home games at the Brisbane Entertainment Centre (along with falling attendances) forced the Bullets to move to the smaller (4,000) capacity Brisbane Convention & Exhibition Centre from the 1998 season.

Continued decline
The Bullets failed to get to the finals during the early years of the 2000s. The 2000–01 season was especially disappointing for the Bullets, as they finished second-last on the regular season table, winning just 4 of their 28 fixtures. Although, the Bullets won 22 of their 33 fixtures in 2003–04 to finish in a more respectable fourth place on the ladder.

The team qualified for the finals in the 2004–05 and the 2005–06 seasons. They finished in fifth place in 2005–06, and hosted the Perth Wildcats at home in Game 1, though they lost 96–91 and were eliminated.

Back on top

The addition of veteran Australian Boomers centre and the NBL's all-time leading rebounder Mark Bradtke after the 2005–06 season saw expectations rise for the Bullets once more. During the 2006–07 pre-season Blitz, the Bullets won all three of their group stage games to finish at the top of Pool A and advance to the quarter-finals. Defeating the Wollongong Hawks and the Sydney Kings to make it into the final, the Bullets went on to defeat the Melbourne Tigers to win the pre-season title.

Following on from their pre-season success, the Bullets easily won the minor premiership for the 2006–07 season, claiming an end of season record of 28 wins and only five losses. This included an all-time NBL record-breaking 21-game winning streak, marking the Bullets' most successful season in their history. After defeating the Sydney Kings in the semis, Brisbane made their first NBL grand final since 1990. They took out the finals series 3–1 over defending champions the Melbourne Tigers to be crowned NBL champions for a third time.

League departure
In March 2008, following the 2007–08 season, the Bullets' childcare-centre mogul owner Eddy Groves – who had run into financial strife with his ABC Learning Centres empire – announced he would be forced to sell the club. On 16 April 2008, Logan businessman David Kemp was officially announced as the new owner. However, Kemp pulled out of the sale, and attempts to find a new ownership group were unsuccessful. On 30 June 2008, it was announced that the Bullets' license had been returned to the NBL.

Hope for revival
In August 2011, Basketball Australia CEO Larry Sengstock revealed that there had been significant progress towards returning a team to Brisbane for the 2012–13 season and that he wanted the team to be called the Bullets. However, in May 2012, the NBL announced that the Bullets' return was rejected, on the heels of another Queensland-based team, the Gold Coast Blaze, going into administration.

In November 2013, with the NBL under new management, CEO Fraser Neill announced that bringing the Bullets back to Brisbane was a priority. In March 2014, the #BringBackTheBullets social media campaign across Facebook, Twitter and Instagram commenced with an aim to raise awareness for the return of professional basketball to Brisbane as soon as possible.

Return to the league
After years of public outcry to have a Brisbane team back in the NBL, moves were finally put in place to have the Bullets return to the league for the 2016–17 season in September 2015. It was announced that the team would primarily adopt the traditional Queensland sporting colours of maroon and gold as well as retaining their blue heritage colour, plus return to their former home venue at the Brisbane Convention & Exhibition Centre, Southbank. The Bullets' traditional colours of blue and gold was brought back for the 2017–18 season.

Home arena
Upon the Bullets' entry to the NBL in 1979, the team was based at the Auchenflower Stadium. They remained there until 1983 before moving to the larger Sleeman Sports Centre in Chandler at the start of the 1984 season. The Bullets remained at Chandler until relocating to the 13,500 seat Brisbane Entertainment Centre in Boondall midway through 1986, staying at Boondall until the end of the 1997 season. From 1986 until the South East Melbourne Magic and Melbourne Tigers started using the 15,400 capacity National Tennis Centre (now Rod Laver Arena) in 1992, the BEC was the largest and most modern venue used in the NBL. The Brisbane Convention & Exhibition Centre in South Bank then became the Bullets' home court from 1998 to 2008.

Although the Convention Centre was the Bullets' home venue at the time, for the 2007 NBL Grand Final series against the Melbourne Tigers, they moved back to the larger capacity Brisbane Entertainment Centre.

The Brisbane Entertainment Centre was the site of the NBL's first 10,000-plus Grand Final attendance when 11,000 fans saw Game 1 of the 1986 Grand Final series between the Bullets and the Adelaide 36ers. The largest attendance for the Bullets was on 26 October 1990 when 13,221 fans saw them defeat the Perth Wildcats 106–90 in Game 2 of the 1990 Grand Final series.

The move to the BEC was a risky one as it was (at the time) almost twice the capacity of the NBL's next largest venue, the 7,200 seat Glass House in Melbourne. However, the move was a success, with the Bullets pulling in record attendances and it was the move to the BEC that was the catalyst for growth in the NBL. Previously teams had played out of small arenas and even local sports centres (e.g. Auchenflower Stadium) which had limited seating. Indeed, the smallest venue in the NBL at the time was the 1,500 seat Perry Lakes Basketball Stadium in Perth (in 1985 the average size NBL venue was just 3,008. By 1992, the average size had risen to 7,155). In the years following Brisbane's move, other large venues such as the Perth Entertainment Centre (8,200), Sydney Entertainment Centre (12,500), Adelaide's Clipsal Powerhouse (8,000) and the National Tennis Centre in Melbourne (15,300) became regular NBL venues, with other teams following the lead of the Bullets.

With their return to the NBL in 2016, the Bullets chose the Convention Centre as their regular home venue, and the Entertainment Centre in Boondall as their alternate venue for marquee matches. However, with the construction of Nissan Arena in 2019, the Bullets chose to relocate to combine their front office, training centre and home stadium into one facility.

 Auchenflower Stadium (1979–1983)
 Sleeman Sports Centre (1984–1986)
 Brisbane Entertainment Centre (1986–1997, 2007, 2016–2019)
 Brisbane Convention & Exhibition Centre (1998–2008, 2016–2019)
 Nissan Arena (2019–present)

Retired jerseys

 #7 Larry Sengstock
 #22 Ron Radliff
 #30 Leroy Loggins
 #52  Robert Sibley

Honour roll

* Leroy Loggins was also the Player of the Game in the 1985 NBL Grand Final win, but there was no official Grand Final MVP awarded in 1985.

Source: www.nbl.com.au

Season by season

Current roster

Notable players

 Cameron Bairstow
 Stephen Black
 Dillon Boucher
 Craig Bradshaw
 Mark Bradtke
 Taylor Braun
/ Cal Bruton
/ C. J. Bruton
 Jason Cadee
/ Lanard Copeland
 Torrey Craig
 Winston Crite
 Mark Dalton
 John Dorge
 Ebi Ere
 Kevin Freeman
 Alonzo Gee
 Adam Gibson
 Cameron Gliddon
 Chris Goulding
 Shane Heal
 Wade Helliwell
 Makoto Hiejima
 Mick Hill
 Tom Jervis
 Daniel Kickert
/ Leroy Loggins
 Sam Mackinnon
 Will Magnay
 Dwayne McClain
 Mike McKay
/ Andre Moore
 Danny Morseu
 Chris Munk
 Mark Nash
 Lamar Patterson
 Anthony Petrie
/ Ron Radliff
 Paul Rees
/ Derek Rucker
 Randy Rutherford
 Damien Ryan
 Larry Sengstock
 Robert Sibley
 Nathan Sobey
 Reuben Te Rangi
 Mika Vukona
 Brad Williamson
 Steve Woodberry

Preseason games against NBA teams

References

External links
 

 
National Basketball League (Australia) teams
Sporting clubs in Brisbane
Basketball teams in Queensland
Basketball teams established in 1979
1979 establishments in Australia